The 2008 TT Pro League was the tenth season of the TT Pro League, the Trinidad and Tobago professional league for association football clubs, since its establishment in 1999. A total of ten teams took part in the league, with San Juan Jabloteh the defending champions. The season began on 5 April and ended on 29 November, with the conclusion of the Lucozade Sport Big Six.

Ma Pau were admitted as a new club into the league and would be based in Woodbrook. After one season upon their return to the Pro League, Police withdrew with the intention of returning for the 2009 season. The Superstar Rangers decided to change the name of the club to St. Ann's Rangers to increase community awareness.

The first goal of the season was scored by San Juan Jabloteh's Peter Byers against Ma Pau in the sixth minute of the first game on 5 April. Devorn Jorsling, who also scored on the first day, went on to claim the Golden Boot with a season high 21 goals. Josimar Belgrave of St. Ann's Rangers scored the first hat-trick of the season against Tobago United on 3 May, having scored a season high four goals in the match.

Following the regular season, San Juan Jabloteh, W Connection, Caledonia AIA, Joe Public, North East Stars, and United Petrotrin all qualified for the Lucozade Sport Big Six. However, Jabloteh and W Connection were 20 points clear of third place, Caledonia AIA, before the competition began. The league was won on the final day of the season, when the San Juan Kings used a draw over W Connection to defend their crown and win their fourth Pro League title. Having finished as the league champion and runner-up, San Juan Jabloteh and W Connection both qualified for the 2009 CFU Club Championship.

After the season, North East Stars withdrew from the Pro League, citing the state of their home ground, Sangre Grande Recreational Ground, for the past few years as the cause to sit out the 2009 season. The Sangre Grande Boys stated that they fully intend to return to the Pro League following needed repairs and improvements to the ground.

Changes from the 2007 season
The following changes were made since the 2007 season:

There were a number of changes to the clubs competing in the 2008 season.
Ma Pau, based in Woodbrook were admitted into the league as an expansion club.
Police withdrew from the league after commissioner Trevor Paul issued a directive to ban lawmen from participating in sporting activities.
Superstar Rangers changed the name of the club to St. Ann's Rangers to increase community awareness.
San Juan Jabloteh signed a three-year partnership with Celtic of the Scottish Premier League. 
The agreement allows the two sides to develop greater commercial value, youth and coach development, and create opportunities for the transfer of players.
WASA, the 2007 National Super League champions, applied for Pro League admission. The club was not admitted as they were unable to meet Pro League standards.

Teams

Team summaries

Note: Flags indicate national team as has been defined under FIFA eligibility rules. Players may hold more than one non-FIFA nationality.

Managerial changes

Regular season

Competition table

Results

Matches 1–18

Matches 19–27

Lucozade Sport Big Six

Competition table

Results

League table

Positions by round

Season statistics

Scoring
 First goal of the season: Peter Byers for San Juan Jabloteh against Ma Pau, (5 April 2008).
 Last goal of the season: Sean Cooper for North East Stars against United Petrotrin, (29 November 2008).
 First own goal of the season: Karlon Murray (San Juan Jabloteh) for Ma Pau, (5 April 2008).
 First penalty kick of the season: Kennedy Hinkson (scored) for United Petrotrin against North East Stars (5 April 2008).
 First hat-trick of the season: Josimar Belgrave (St. Ann's Rangers) against Tobago United, 19', 33', 49', 90' (3 May 2008).
 Most goals scored by one player in a match: 4 goals 
 Josimar Belgrave (St. Ann's Rangers) against Tobago United, 19', 33', 49', 90' (3 May 2008).
 Widest winning margin: 10 goals
 Tobago United 0–10 Defence Force (23 October 2008)
 Most goals in a match: 10 goals
 Tobago United 0–10 Defence Force (23 October 2008)
 Most goals in one half: 5 goals
 Tobago United v Defence Force (23 October 2008) 0–5 at half-time, 0–10 final.
 W Connection v St. Ann's Rangers (30 October 2008) 3–0 at half-time, 6–2 final.
 North East Stars v Defence Force (1 November 2008) 2–3 at half-time, 3–3 final.
 Most goals in one half by a single team: 5 goals
 Tobago United v Defence Force (23 October 2008) 0–5 at half-time, 0–10 final.

Top scorers

Hat-tricks

 * Home team score first in result
 4 Player scored four goals

Discipline
 First red card of the season: Michael Woods for Caledonia AIA against St. Ann's Rangers, (5 April 2008).

Awards

Annual awards

The 2008 TT Pro League awards distribution took place on Super Friday, 8 May 2009, prior to the 2009 season's opening match at Marvin Lee Stadium.

Having won the Pro League and Big Six titles, San Juan Jabloteh was named the Team of the Year for the second time. Having led the San Juan Kings to their fourth league championship, Terry Fenwick won his first Manager of the Year award. Midfielder Trent Noel was named the Player of the Year; receiving the award for the first in his career. After recording 21 goals, Defence Force's Devorn Jorsling received the Golden Boot. In addition, North East Stars was named the Most Disciplined Team of the Year. Neal Brizan, won his second consecutive Referee of the Year award and Boris Punch was named the Match Commissioner of the Year.

References

External links
Official Website
Soca Warriors Online, TT Pro League

TT Pro League seasons
1
Trinidad
Trinidad